Heinz Werner may refer to:

 Heinz Werner (psychologist) (1890–1964), developmental psychologist
 Heinz Werner (footballer, born 1910) (1910–1989), German footballer
 Heinz Werner (footballer, born 1916) (1916–1968), German footballer and coach
 Heinz Werner (Waffen-SS)